Carolina Wilhelmina Stålberg (26 November 1803, Stockholm – 23 July 1872, Mariefred) was a Swedish writer, poet, translator, and lyricist. She worked under the pseudonym "Wilhelmina".

Selected works

References

Sources 
Krook, Axel (1872). Wilhelmina Ståhlberg (obituary). Svea Folk-kalender (1873): sid. 221–224. Libris 2105141 
Stålberg, Karolina Vilhelmina, Nordisk familjebok (2nd edition, 1918)

Further reading  
  

1803 births
1872 deaths
19th-century Swedish women writers
19th-century translators
Writers from Stockholm
Swedish lyricists
Swedish women poets
Swedish poets
Swedish translators